ASSI may refer to:
Air Safety Support International, a subsidiary of the British Civil Aviation Authority
Area of Special Scientific Interest, a conservation designation in the Isle of Man and Northern Ireland